Julius August Isaak Jolly (21 February 1823, Mannheim - 14 October 1891, Karlsruhe) was a German politician. From 1868 to 1876 he was Staatsminister and head of government for the Grand Duchy of Baden. His brother was the physicist Philipp von Jolly.

Bibliography
 
 
 Robert Goldschmit: Julius Jolly. In: Badische Biographien. Tl. 5, Heidelberg 1906, S. 327–352 (Online).

External links
 
 http://ka.stadtwiki.net/Julius_Jolly

Politicians from Mannheim
Ministers-President of Baden
Ministers of the Grand Duchy of Baden
Politicians of the Grand Duchy of Baden
1823 births
1891 deaths
National Liberal Party (Germany) politicians
Members of the First Chamber of the Diet of the Grand Duchy of Baden
Members of the Second Chamber of the Diet of the Grand Duchy of Baden